Maria Martins (born 1 April 1974) is a French middle distance runner who specializes in the 1500 and 3000 metres. She was born in Santa Katarina, Cape Verde.

Arriving in Roubaix in 1988 to rejoin her father, Maria is 1.62m tall and weighs 50 kg. A teacher of hers detected her aptitude for Track and Field and directed her towards athletics. She restarted training in 1999 encouraged by her coach at Club Villeneuve and then she ran for club US Tourcoing (which became club  in 2006). She has been selected 24 times for French elite Track teams..

In August 2007, she was selected to participate in the 2007 World Championship Athletic team.

Prizes 
Cross-Country
  in 2005.
  in 2000, 2002 and 2005.
  in 2002.
Athletics
 French Champion 1500 m (outdoor) - 
 French Champion 1500 m (indoor) - 
 French Champion 3000 m (indoor) - ,

Achievements

Personal Bests
Outdoor

Indoor

External links

1974 births
Living people
French female middle-distance runners
Athletes (track and field) at the 2004 Summer Olympics
Olympic athletes of France
Cape Verdean emigrants to France
People from Santa Catarina, Cape Verde